The Cache Creek landfill is a landfill in British Columbia, Canada. In 1989, Cache Creek became a landfill site for garbage shipped by truck from BC's Lower Mainland. It is permitted to receive up to 500,000 tonnes of municipal solid waste annually.

Extension approved
On January 6, 2010, the Ministry of Environment of B.C. had approved the 42-hectare extension of the existing Cache Creek Landfill, providing an additional 12.6 million tonnes of disposal capacity. This project is expected to have a lifespan of 25 years or more, depending on increasing rates of material recovery (through composting and recycling).

See also
Delta landfill

References

External links
For more information

Landfills in Canada
Geography of Vancouver